The Putna-Vrancea Natural Park is a protected area (natural park category V IUCN) situate in Romania, in administrative territory of Vrancea County.

Location
The Natural Park is located in the Vrancea Mountains (Eastern Carpathians), in the hydrographical basin of the Putna River. It is situated in the northwestern part of Vrancea County, on the border with Covasna County, and lies on the administrative territories of the communes Nistorești, Păulești, Soveja, and Tulnici. It is traversed by National Road , which connects Panciu to Lepșa.

Description

References

Protected areas of Romania
Geography of Vrancea County
Protected areas established in 2005
Tourist attractions in Vrancea County